Elections were held in the organized municipalities in the Timiskaming District of Ontario on October 27, 2014 in conjunction with municipal elections across the province.

Armstrong

Brethour

Casey

Chamberlain
No election was held for reeve. The matter will be decided by council in December.

Charlton and Dack

Cobalt

Coleman

Englehart

Evanturel

Gauthier

Harley

Harris

Hilliard

Hudson

James

Kerns

Kirkland Lake

Larder Lake

Latchford
Latchford had the highest turnout of any municipality in the province at 86.63%.

Matachewan

McGarry

Temiskaming Shores

Thornloe

References
Results

Timiskaming
Timiskaming District